John Kelso may refer to:
 John R. Kelso, American politician, author, lecturer and school principal 
 J. J. Kelso (John Joseph Kelso), newspaper reporter and social crusader
 John of Kelso, Tironensian monk and bishop

See also